Robert "Bobby" Thomas Moffett (born June 1, 1990) is an American mixed martial artist (MMA) who competes in the Featherweight division of the Professional Fighters League (PFL). A professional since 2013, he has also competed for the Ultimate Fighting Championship, RFA, and Legacy Fighting Alliance.

Background 
Moffett started training in karate when he was young and competed in wrestling since third grade and throughout high school. Moffett learned jiu-jitsu not long after to fulfill his dream to be a fighter after watching UFC Ultimate Fighter TV program.

Mixed martial arts career

Early career 
After compiling an amateur record of 6–0, Moffett started his professional MMA career in 2013. He fought under various promoters in the southern region of United States, notably Resurrection Fighting Alliance (RFA) and Legacy Fighting Alliance (LFA). He amassed a record of 12–3 prior participated in Dana White's Tuesday Night Contender Series.

Dana White's Tuesday Night Contender Series 
Moffett appeared in Dana White's Contender Series 16 web-series program, facing Jacob Kilburn  on July 10, 2018. He won the fight via unanimous decision and earned a UFC contract.

Ultimate Fighting Championship
Moffett made his UFC debut on November 10, 2018 at UFC Fight Night: Korean Zombie vs. Rodríguez, against Chas Skelly. He won the fight via a controversial technical submission. Subsequently, Skelly appealed to the Colorado Office of Combative Sports on grounds of referee error regarding the stoppage. Eventually on June 24, 2020, Skelly announced on his social media account that the results was overturned to no contest.

His next fight came on March 23, 2019 at UFC Fight Night: Thompson vs. Pettis against Bryce Mitchell. He lost the fight via unanimous decision. This fight earned both the Fight of the Night award.

Moffett faced Enrique Barzola on August 10, 2019 at UFC Fight Night: Shevchenko vs. Carmouche 2.  He lost the fight via split decision. With this loss, he was subsequently released by UFC.

Professional Fighters League 
Moffett, as a replacement for Anthony Dizy, faced Bubba Jenkins at PFL 4 on June 10, 2021. He lost the bout via unanimous decision.

Moffett faced Jason Knight on August 27, 2021 at PFL 9. At weigh-ins, Moffett weighed in at 148.2 pounds, missing weight by 2.2  pounds. The bout proceeded at catchweight and Moffett was fined a percentage of his purse, which went to Jason Knight. He won the bout via unanimous decision.

Return to regional circuit
Moffett faced Charles Cheeks III at Fury FC 57 on February 11, 2022. He won the bout via unanimous decision.

Moffett faced Austin Wourms on November 4, 2022 at Freedom Fight Night 3, winning the bout via brabo choke in the first round.

Personal life
Bobby and his wife Yulissa have a daughter, Camila (born 2021).

Championships and accomplishments
Ultimate Fighting Championship
Fight of the Night (one time) 
Warrior Xtreme Cagefighting
WXC Featherweight Championship (one time; former)

Mixed martial arts record

|-
|Win
|align=center|16–6 (1)
|Austin Wourms
|Submission (brabo choke)
|Freedom Fight Night 3
|
|align=center|1
|align=center|3:12
|Phoenix, Arizona, United States
|
|-
|Win
|align=center|15–6 (1)
|Charles Cheeks III
|Decision (unanimous)
|Fury FC 57
|
|align=center|3
|align=center|5:00
|Humble, Texas, United States
|
|-
|Win
|align=center|14–6 (1)
|Jason Knight
|Decision (unanimous)
|PFL 9 
|
|align=center|3
|align=center|5:00
|Hollywood, Florida, United States
|
|-
|Loss
|align=center|13–6 (1)
|Bubba Jenkins
|Decision (unanimous)
|PFL 4 
|
|align=center|3
|align=center|5:00
|Atlantic City, New Jersey, United States
|
|-
|Loss
|align=center|13–5 (1)
|Enrique Barzola
|Decision (split)
|UFC Fight Night: Shevchenko vs. Carmouche 2
|
|align=center|3
|align=center|5:00
|Montevideo, Uruguay
|
|-
|Loss
|align=center|13–4 (1)
|Bryce Mitchell
|Decision (unanimous)
|UFC Fight Night: Thompson vs. Pettis
|
|align=center|3
|align=center|5:00
|Nashville, Tennessee, United States
|
|-
|NC
|align=center|13–3 (1)
|Chas Skelly
|NC (overturned)
|UFC Fight Night: Korean Zombie vs. Rodríguez
|
|align=center|2
|align=center|2:43
|Denver, Colorado, United States
|
|-
|Win
|align=center|13–3
|Jacob Kilburn
|Submission (Brabo choke)
|Dana White's Contender Series 16
|
|align=center|2
|align=center|1:02
|Las Vegas, Nevada, United States
|
|-
|Win
|align=center|12–3
|Johnathon Jackson
|Submission (Brabo choke)
|V3 Fights 69
|
|align=center|2
|align=center|1:02
|Memphis, Tennessee, United States
|
|-
|Win
|align=center|11–3
|Enrique Gonzalez
|Decision (unanimous)
|V3 Fights 60
|
|align=center|3
|align=center|5:00
|Hammond, Indiana, United States
|
|-
|Loss
|align=center|10–3
|Thanh Le 
|TKO (punches)
|LFA 31
|
|align=center|2
|align=center|0:55
|Phoenix, Arizona, United States
|
|-
|Win
|align=center|10–2
|Nate Jennerman
|Decision (unanimous)
|LFA 20
|
|align=center|3
|align=center|5:00
|Prior Lake, Minnesota, United States
|
|-
|Win
|align=center|9–2
|T.J. Brown
|Decision (split)
|RFA 46
|
|align=center|3
|align=center|5:00
|Branson, Missouri, United States
|
|-
|Loss
|align=center|8–2
|Raoni Barcelos
|Decision (unanimous)
|RFA 39
|
|align=center|5
|align=center|5:00
|Hammond, Indiana, United States
|
|-
|Win
|align=center|8–1
|Caleb Williams
|Submission (arm-triangle choke)
|Hoosier Fight Club 27
|
|align=center|2
|align=center|4:46
|Michigan City, Indiana, United States
|
|-
|Win
|align=center|7–1
|Dan Moret
|Decision (unanimous)
|RFA 24
|
|align=center|3
|align=center|5:00
|Prior Lake, Minnesota, United States
|
|-
|Win
|align=center|6–1
|David Harris
|Submission (arm-triangle choke)
|WXC 55
|
|align=center|2
|align=center|1:19
|Southgate, Michigan, United States
|Won the vacant WXC Featherweight Championship.
|-
|Win
|align=center|5–1
|Scott Marckini
|TKO (corner stoppage)
|Hoosier Fight Club 22
|
|align=center|1
|align=center|5:00
|Valparaiso, Indiana, United States
|
|-
|Loss
|align=center|4–1
|Kenny Jordan
|Decision (Unanimous)
|Hoosier Fight Club 21
|
|align=center|3
|align=center|5:00
|Villa Park, Illinois, United States
|
|-
|Win
|align=center|4–0
|Pedro Velasco
|Submission (rear-naked choke)
|APFC 16
|
|align=center|1
|align=center|1:44
|Villa Park, Illinois, United States
|
|-
|Win
|align=center|3–0
|Terry House Jr.
|Submission (Brabo choke)
|Hoosier Fight Club 19
|
|align=center|1
|align=center|3:25
|Valparaiso, Indiana, United States
|
|-
|Win
|align=center|2–0
|Drew Morais
|Submission (Choke)
|APFC 14
|
|align=center|1
|align=center|1:04
|McCook, Illinois, United States
|Catchweight (150 lbs) bout.
|-
|Win
|align=center|1–0
|Julian Collins
|Submission (Brabo choke)
|APFC 11
|
|align=center|1
|align=center|1:21
|McCook, Illinois, United States
|
|-

See also
List of current PFL fighters
List of male mixed martial artists

References

External links
 Bobby Moffett at PFL
 
 

1990 births
Living people
Featherweight mixed martial artists
Mixed martial artists utilizing wrestling
Mixed martial artists utilizing karate
Mixed martial artists utilizing Brazilian jiu-jitsu
American male mixed martial artists
American male karateka
American practitioners of Brazilian jiu-jitsu
People awarded a black belt in Brazilian jiu-jitsu
Mixed martial artists from Illinois
Ultimate Fighting Championship male fighters